is a Japanese footballer currently playing as a right back for Nagoya Grampus.

Career statistics

Club
.

Notes

Honours
Nagoya Grampus
J.League Cup: 2021

References

External links

1997 births
Living people
Meiji University alumni
Japanese footballers
Association football midfielders
J1 League players
Júbilo Iwata players
Sagan Tosu players
Nagoya Grampus players